Emir Bekrić (born 14 March 1991) is a former Serbian hurdler who specialises and holds the Serbian national record for the 400 metres hurdles. He is coached by Mirjana Stojanović. In 2013, Bekrić became the first male track and field athlete from Serbia to win a medal at the IAAF Outdoor World Championships. In the same year he won the award European athletics rising star, as well as golden badge for Serbian athlete of the year.

Early life
Born to a Bosniak father and a Serb mother, Emir has a sister named Sena. He is an Orthodox Christian, and has said that religion and Orthodoxy are very important for him and have helped him in his career.

Hurdling career
Bekrić won a bronze medal at the 2011 European Athletics U23 Championships in Ostrava. At the 2011 Summer Universiade in Shenzhen he broke the national record in semifinal for the 400 meter hurdles, breaking 50 seconds and beating Jeshua Anderson who later won the gold medal in the finals. At the 2012 European Championships he again broke national record in semifinals. In the final he won a silver medal. At the 2012 Summer Olympics in London, Bekrić broke the Serbian national record for the 400m hurdles for the third time with a time of 49.21 seconds. At the 2013 World Championships in Athletics in Moscow he won the bronze medal and posted the new national record with a time of 48.05 seconds.

Personal bests

Outdoor

Indoor

Achievements

See also
 Serbian records in athletics

References

External links
 
 
 
 
 

1991 births
Living people
Athletes from Belgrade
Serbian male hurdlers
Olympic athletes of Serbia
Athletes (track and field) at the 2012 Summer Olympics
Mediterranean Games gold medalists for Serbia
Athletes (track and field) at the 2013 Mediterranean Games
World Athletics Championships athletes for Serbia
European Athletics Championships medalists
Members of the Serbian Orthodox Church
Bosniaks of Serbia
European Athletics Rising Star of the Year winners
Mediterranean Games medalists in athletics